Thomas “Tommy” Murray was a Scottish-American football (soccer) right halfback who played the first two U.S. national team games in 1916.

Professional career
Murray played several years for Bethlehem Steel F.C. of the National Association Football League during their years as the dominant U.S. team.  He played with the team from at least 1914 to at least 1919.  However, in 1918, he spent time in the military when the U.S. entry into World War I.  In 1919 he is listed with Paterson F.C. He then moved to Philadelphia Field Club for the 1921-1922 American Soccer League season.  In 1923, he is listed as with Harrison S.C., but does not appear to have played a game with them.  In 1923, he moved to the Newark Skeeters.  In 1924, he began the season with the Brooklyn Wanderers before finishing it with Indiana Flooring.  That was his last season in the ASL.

National team
Murray earned two caps with the national team in 1916.  In the first official U.S. national team game, the U.S. defeated Sweden on August 20, 1916.  On September 3, 1916, Murray and his team mates tied Norway before returning to the U.S.

Personal
In addition to playing for Bethlehem Steel F.C., Murray was also employed as a machinist by the Bethlehem Steel company.  He married the former Jessie T. Kerr on July 26, 1917.

External links
National Challenge Cup results and rosters
Newspaper article about 1919 Bethlehem Steel tour of Scandinavia

References

United States men's international soccer players
National Association Football League players
Bethlehem Steel F.C. (1907–1930) players
Paterson F.C. players
American Soccer League (1921–1933) players
Philadelphia Field Club players
Harrison S.C. players
Newark Skeeters players
Brooklyn Wanderers players
Indiana Flooring players
Year of birth missing
Year of death missing
American soccer players
Association football midfielders